The Massey Lectures is an annual five-part series of lectures given in Canada by distinguished writers, thinkers and scholars who explore important ideas and issues of contemporary interest. Created in 1961 in honour of Vincent Massey, the former Governor General of Canada, it is widely regarded as one of the most acclaimed lecture series in the country.

Some of the most notable Massey Lecturers have included Northrop Frye, John Kenneth Galbraith, Noam Chomsky, Jean Vanier, Margaret Atwood, Ursula Franklin, George Steiner, Claude Levi Strauss, and Nobel laureates Martin Luther King Jr., George Wald, Willy Brandt and Doris Lessing. In 2003, novelist Thomas King was the first person of Cherokee descent to be invited as a lecturer.

Sponsorship 
The event is co-sponsored by CBC Radio, House of Anansi Press and Massey College in the University of Toronto. The lectures have been broadcast by the CBC Radio show Ideas since 1965.

Prior to 1989, the lectures were recorded for broadcast in a CBC Radio studio in Toronto. From 1989 to 2002, the lectures were delivered before a live audience at the University of Toronto. Since 2002, the lectures have been presented and recorded for broadcast at public events in five different cities across Canada.

The lectures are broadcast each November on Ideas and published simultaneously in book form by House of Anansi Press.

Many of the lectures can be listened to online on the Ideas website, while others can be purchased on various sites.

In addition to the print version for each individual year, several of the earlier lectures are available in compilations, including The Lost Massey Lectures.

Massey lecturers

1961 – Barbara Ward, The Rich Nations and the Poor Nations
1962 – Northrop Frye, The Educated Imagination
1963 – Frank Underhill, The Image of Confederation
1964 – C. B. Macpherson, The Real World of Democracy
1965 – John Kenneth Galbraith, The Underdeveloped Country
1966 – Paul Goodman, The Moral Ambiguity of America
1967 – Martin Luther King Jr., Conscience for Change
1968 – R. D. Laing, The Politics of the Family
1969 – George Grant, Time as History
1970 – George Wald, Therefore Choose Life
1971 – James Corry, The Power of the Law
1972 – Pierre Dansereau, Inscape and Landscape
1973 – Stafford Beer, Designing Freedom
1974 – George Steiner, Nostalgia for the Absolute
1975 – J. Tuzo Wilson, Limits to Science
1976 – No Lecture
1977 – Claude Lévi-Strauss, Myth and Meaning
1978 – Leslie Fiedler, The Inadvertent Epic
1979 – Jane Jacobs, Canadian Cities and Sovereignty Association
1980 – No Lecture
1981 – Willy Brandt, Dangers and Options: The Matter of World Survival
1982 – Robert Jay Lifton, Indefensible Weapons
1983 – Eric Kierans, Globalism and the Nation State
1984 – Carlos Fuentes, Latin America: At War with the Past
1985 – Doris Lessing, Prisons We Choose to Live Inside
1986 – No Lecture
1987 – Gregory Baum, Compassion and Solidarity: The Church for Others
1988 – Noam Chomsky, Necessary Illusions: Thought Control in Democratic Societies
1989 – Ursula Franklin, The Real World of Technology
1990 – Richard Lewontin, Biology as Ideology: The Doctrine of DNA
1991 – Charles Taylor, The Malaise of Modernity
1992 – Robert Heilbroner, Twenty-First Century Capitalism
1993 – Jean Bethke Elshtain, Democracy on Trial
1994 – Conor Cruise O'Brien, On the Eve of the Millennium
1995 – John Ralston Saul, The Unconscious Civilization
 1996 – No Lecture (see Notes below)
 1997 – Hugh Kenner, The Elsewhere Community
 1998 – Jean Vanier, Becoming Human
 1999 – Robert Fulford, The Triumph of Narrative
 2000 – Michael Ignatieff, The Rights Revolution
 2001 – Janice Stein, The Cult of Efficiency
 2002 – Margaret Visser, Beyond Fate
 2003 – Thomas King, The Truth About Stories
 2004 – Ronald Wright, A Short History of Progress
 2005 – Stephen Lewis, Race Against Time: Searching for Hope in AIDS-Ravaged Africa
 2006 – Margaret Somerville, The Ethical Imagination
 2007 – Alberto Manguel, The City of Words
 2008 – Margaret Atwood, Payback: Debt and the Shadow Side of Wealth
 2009 – Wade Davis, The Wayfinders: Why Ancient Wisdom Matters in the Modern World
 2010 – Douglas Coupland, Player One: What is to Become of Us
 2011 – Adam Gopnik, Winter: Five Windows on the Season
 2012 – Neil Turok, The Universe Within: From Quantum to Cosmos
 2013 – Lawrence Hill, Blood: The Stuff of Life
 2014 – Adrienne Clarkson, Belonging: The Paradox of Citizenship
 2015 – Margaret MacMillan, History's People: Personalities and the Past 
 2016 – Jennifer Welsh, The Return of History: Conflict, Migration and Geopolitics in the Twenty-First Century
 2017 – Payam Akhavan, In Search of a Better World: A Human Rights Odyssey
 2018 – Tanya Talaga, All Our Relations: Finding the Path Forward
2019 – Sally Armstrong, Power Shift: The Longest Revolution
2020 – Ronald J. Deibert, Reset: Reclaiming the Internet for Civil Society (shortlisted for the 2020 Donner Prize)
2021 – Esi Edugyan, Out of the Sun: On Art, Race and the Future
2022 – Tomson Highway, Laughing with the Trickster: On Sex, Death and Accordions

Notes
For Lawrence Hill's Massey Lectures in 2013, the CBC Radio website featured a visual narrative to accompany that year's theme Blood: The Stuff of Life. The story included full-screen images of blood, animations that visually demonstrated historical attitudes towards blood and videos of people affected culturally by it.

1996 did not feature a lecture because Ideas producers and the selected Lecturer Robert Theobald could not agree on an appropriate manuscript for the programme. The theme was to have been on the future of work. Theobald later published his manuscript as Reworking Success: New Communities at the Millennium (1997).

References

External links 
CBC Ideas site
CBC Massey Lectures Archive

 
1961 establishments in Ontario
CBC Radio One programs
Canadian talk radio programs
University of Toronto
Lecture series